Wakarusa is an unincorporated community in Shawnee County, Kansas, United States. As of the 2020 census, the population of the community and nearby areas was 242. Wakarusa is also the name of an unincorporated community in adjacent Douglas County, Kansas, 6.6 mi (10.6 km) southwest of downtown Lawrence and the name of the township that includes Lawrence, Kansas.

History
Wakarusa was founded in 1858.

Wakarusa has a post office with ZIP code 66546.

Demographics

For statistical purposes, the United States Census Bureau has defined Wakarusa as a census-designated place (CDP).

Education
The community is served by Auburn–Washburn USD 437 public school district.

References

Further reading

 Living in the Depot: The Two-Story Railroad Station; H. Roger Grant; University of Iowa Press; 130 pages; 1993; .  Contains historic images of Kansas stations at Alta Vista, Bucklin, Comiskey, Haddam, Hoyt, and Wakarusa.

External links
 Shawnee County maps: Current, Historic, KDOT

Census-designated places in Shawnee County, Kansas
Census-designated places in Kansas